Benison is a surname. Notable people with the surname include:

Alf Benison (1918–1979), Australian rules footballer 
Arthur Benison Hubback (1871–1948), English architect and soldier
John Benison (born 1946), Australian rules footballer

See also
Benson (surname)